Sindicola is a genus of moth in the family Cosmopterigidae.

Species
Sindicola juengeri Amsel, 1968
Sindicola squamella Amsel, 1968

Status unknown
Sindicola ussuriella Sinev

References
Natural History Museum Lepidoptera genus database

Cosmopterigidae